Robert Lowery (born Robert Lowery Hanks, October 17, 1913 – December 26, 1971) was an American motion picture, television, and stage actor who appeared in more than 70 films.

Early life
Born in Kansas City, Missouri, Lowery grew up on Wayne Avenue near the long-demolished Electric Park. Lowery's father was a local attorney and oil investor who worked several years for the Pullman Corporation as a railroad agent; his mother, Leah Thompson Hanks, was a concert pianist. 

Syndicated newspaper columnist Harrison Carroll reported that Lowery was "a direct descendant of Nancy Hanks" (Lincoln).

He graduated from Paseo High School in Kansas City, and soon was invited to sing with the Slats Randall Orchestra in the early 1930s. Lowery played on the Kansas City Blues minor league baseball team and was overall considered a versatile athlete; his physique and strength were gained from a stint working in a paper factory as a teenager. After the death of his father in 1935, he traveled to Hollywood with  his mother and their housekeeper, and enrolled in the Lila Bliss acting school before being signed by Twentieth Century Fox in 1937.

Career

Lowery debuted in motion pictures in Come and Get It (1936).

During his career, Lowery was primarily known for roles in action films such as The Mark of Zorro (1940), The Mummy's Ghost (1944), and Dangerous Passage (1944). He became the second actor to play DC Comics' Batman (succeeding Lewis Wilson), starring in a 1949's Batman and Robin serial.

Lowery also had roles in a number of Western films, including The Homesteaders (1953), The Parson and the Outlaw (1957), playing Gangster-mastermind Arnold Rothstein in The Rise and Fall of Legs Diamond (1960), Young Guns of Texas (1962), and Johnny Reno (1966). He was also a stage actor and appeared in Born Yesterday, The Caine Mutiny, and in several other productions.

On television, Lowery was best known for the role of Big Tim Champion on the series Circus Boy (1956–1957).  In 1956, he guest starred in "The Deadly Rock," an episode of The Adventures of Superman (which was the first time a Batman actor shared screen time with a Superman actor, although Lowery and Reeves had appeared together in their presuperhero days in the 1942 World War II anti-VD propaganda film, Sex Hygiene.) Lowery also had guest roles on Perry Mason, featured as murder victim Amos Bryant in "The Case of the Roving River" and as Andrew Collis in "The Case of the Provocative Protégé", Playhouse 90 ("The Helen Morgan Story"), Hazel, Cowboy G-Men, as Foxy Smith on Maverick in the 1959 episode "Full House" starring James Garner with Joel Grey as Billy the Kid, Tales of Wells Fargo, Rawhide, 77 Sunset Strip, Hawaiian Eye, and Pistols 'n' Petticoats.

He made his last on-screen appearance in the 1967 comedy/Western film The Ballad of Josie, opposite Doris Day and Peter Graves.

Personal life and death
He was married three times, to three actresses.  Jean Parker and he had a son, Robert Lowery Hanks II, in 1952.

His other wives were Vivan Wilcox and Barbara "Rusty" Farrell, whom he married on March 21, 1947 in Las Vegas, Nevada.

Although a divorce action was filed in his last marriage to Parker, it was never finalized. 

Lowery died of heart failure at the age of 58 in his Los Angeles apartment on December 26, 1971.

Filmography

References

External links

Robert Lowery and Jean Parker in The Navy Way from YouTube

1913 births
1971 deaths
Male actors from Kansas City, Missouri
American male film actors
American male stage actors
American male television actors
Burials at Valhalla Memorial Park Cemetery
Male Western (genre) film actors
20th-century American male actors